Tenby railway station in Tenby is on the  branch of the West Wales Line operated by Transport for Wales Rail, who also manage the station.

History
The first station at Tenby was opened by the Pembroke and Tenby Railway as the terminus of a line from Pembroke on 6 August 1863.

This original terminus station was low-lying and when the decision was made to extend the line to Whitland, a new railway was constructed from the existing Pembroke and Tenby line, at a point called Black Rock Junction, which then climbed to the higher level necessary for the extension. To the north of the station is a viaduct carrying the line towards Whitland. It has seven arches and is 136 yards (125 metres) in length. It is a Grade II listed structure. The new Tenby station was opened on 4 September 1866. The original station was then used for freight traffic and became known as "Tenby Lower Yard". It was closed and removed in 1965.

The present station buildings date from 1871 and were designed by James Szlumper and built in Bath stone. The original cast iron canopy is still in place. A later passenger footbridge now links the two platforms.

Tenby has had two signal boxes. The first, of timber construction, opened in 1895 and closed in 1956. Its successor opened in 1956 and closed in 1988.

The only passing loop on the Whitland to Pembroke Dock branch is located at Tenby, allowing east and westbound trains to pass here. As there is no longer a signal box at the station, the electric token instruments for the block sections either side are operated by the train crew under the supervision of the Whitland signaller (a similar system operates on the Heart of Wales Line). Tenby has the first application of motor points worked directly by the token system.

Facilities
The station is unmanned but has a ticket machine. There is a shelter on the eastbound platform in addition to the canopies on each side. Train running information is available via digital display screens, a help point on platform 2, timetable posters and by telephone. There is a payphone in the station car park.  The platforms are linked by footbridge, but wheelchair and mobility impaired users may reach the eastbound platform by means of a barrow crossing (with assistance).  Level access is available from the car park to the westbound platform.

Services 

The station is served by the Swansea to Pembroke Dock local trains, which run approximately every two hours each way with some additional peak services. Some early morning and late night trains run only as far as Carmarthen. There are two trains each way from Manchester Piccadilly. There is a Sunday service of five trains per day.

References

External links 

Railway stations in Pembrokeshire
DfT Category F1 stations
Former Great Western Railway stations
Railway stations in Great Britain opened in 1863
Railway stations in Great Britain closed in 1866
Railway stations in Great Britain opened in 1866
Railway stations served by Great Western Railway
Railway stations served by Transport for Wales Rail
Tenby
1863 establishments in Wales
Grade II listed buildings in Pembrokeshire
Grade II listed railway stations in Wales